Shikohpur( शिकोहपुर ) is a Yadav village in Gurgaon Mandal in Gurgaon District in Haryana State, India. Other villages in the area include Chandu. Main language of this village is Ahirvati.

References 

Villages in Gurgaon district